Kellypalik Mungitok (also known as Mungitok Kellypalik, Mungituk, Mangitak, Mangitak Qillipalik, or Mungitok Killipalik) (1940–?) was an Inuit printmaker from Cape Dorset.

Early life 
As a child, Mungitok learned to hunt from his father, Oshutsiaq Pudlat, a lay minister. His paternal grandmother was a shaman. Around 1958, he and his parents moved to Cape Dorset.

Career 
He was known for his prints, but also worked in sculpture. One of his best known prints, Man Carried to the Moon, depicts birds carrying a smiling man into the air.

Mungitok was married.

Collections
National Museum of the American Indian, 
University of Michigan Museum of Art
National Gallery of Canada the Canadian Museum of History
Museum London 
University of Victoria Art Collections
Brooklyn Museum

References 

1940 births
People from Kinngait
Artists from Nunavut
Inuit from Nunavut
Inuit sculptors
Inuit printmakers
20th-century Canadian sculptors
20th-century Canadian printmakers
Canadian male sculptors
Year of death missing
20th-century Canadian male artists